Big House is the debut studio album by American country music band Big House. It was released on March 25, 1997 via MCA Nashville. The album includes the singles "Cold Outside," "You Ain't Lonely Yet" and "Love Ain't Easy."

Track listing

Personnel

Big House
 Monty Byrom — lead vocals, acoustic guitar, electric guitar
 Tanner Byrom — drums, percussion, background vocals
 Sonny California — harmonica, percussion, background vocals
 Ron Mitchell — bass guitar, background vocals
 David Neuhauser — acoustic guitar, electric guitar, slide guitar, Hammond B-3 organ, background vocals
 Chuck Seaton — electric guitar, acoustic guitar, background vocals

Additional musicians
 Peter Bunetta — percussion
 Billy Russell — rhythm guitar on "Amarillo", "Cryin' Town", and "Sunday in Memphis"

Chart performance

Album

Singles

References

1997 debut albums
Big House (band) albums
MCA Records albums